Fyodor Mezentsev (born 19 November 1989) is a Kazakhstani speed skater. He was brought up in the cit of Almaty and was introduced to skating when he was 10 years old from his mother and sister. He was coached by Dmitry Babenko later in life. As a young adult, he studied international law at Al-Farabi Kazakh National University in Almaty, Kazakhstan.

Career

Mezentsev competed at the 2014 Winter Olympics for Kazakhstan. In the 1000 metres he finished 33rd overall and in the 1500 metres he was 35th.

As of September 2014, Mezentsev's best performance at the World Sprint Speed Skating Championships is 28th, in 2013.

Mezentsev made his World Cup debut in February 2009. As of September 2014, Mezentsev's top World Cup finish is 11th in a 1000m race at Heerenveen in 2012–13. His best overall finish in the World Cup is 29th, in the 1000m in 2012–13.

References 

1989 births
Living people
Kazakhstani male speed skaters
Speed skaters at the 2014 Winter Olympics
Speed skaters at the 2018 Winter Olympics
Olympic speed skaters of Kazakhstan
Speed skaters at the 2017 Asian Winter Games
Medalists at the 2017 Asian Winter Games
Sportspeople from Almaty
Asian Games medalists in speed skating
Asian Games bronze medalists for Kazakhstan
21st-century Kazakhstani people